Crantz may refer to:

Creontius (fl. 771–786), Bavarian official and historian
Heinrich Johann Nepomuk von Crantz (1722–1799), Austrian botanist and a physician